Turnasuyu is a coastal village in the Gülyalı district of Ordu Province, Turkey, which takes its name from the nearby stream of Turna. In the 2010 census, the village had a population of 2,240.

Population

Headmen 
Headmen, by year elected:-
2009 - Ahmet ALBAYRAK
2009 - Muharrem KILIÇ
1999 - Refik KOYUN
1989 - Hayati AKTÜRK
1987 - Mustafa GÜNER
1973 - A. Burhan AYDIN
1967 - Hüseyin ERDAŞ
1966 - Cevat ATASEVER
1963 - Ahmet ÇİÇEK
1938 - Kasım ÇELEBİ
1935 - Hüseyin YILMAZ
(na) - Molla Ahmet AKTÜRK
(na) - Rüşan ERDAŞ
1895 - Hacı Mehmet (KÖKSAL)
1873 - Hüseyin Çavuş (AKKÖSE)

References

External links 
 Turnasuyu Village Web Sities
 Yerelnet
 Ordu Municipality
 Ordu Governorship
 Gülyali Bulletin

Villages in Ordu Province